The Forest River is an  tributary of the Red River of the North in eastern North Dakota in the United States.

See also
List of North Dakota rivers

References

External links

Rivers of North Dakota
Bodies of water of Walsh County, North Dakota
Tributaries of Hudson Bay